Jolanda Kroesen (born May 2, 1979 in Purmerend) is a Dutch softball player, who represents the Dutch national team in international competitions.

Kroesen played for Flying Petrols and since 1997 for Sparks Haarlem. She is an outfielder who bats and throws right-handed. She competes for the Dutch national team since 2001. In that year she was named MVP at the European Championship. She is part of the Dutch team for the 2008 Summer Olympics in Beijing.

External links
 Kroesen at dutchsoftballteam.com

References

1979 births
Living people
Dutch softball players
Olympic softball players of the Netherlands
Softball players at the 2008 Summer Olympics
People from Purmerend
Sportspeople from North Holland